The Kelchstein ("Chalice Rock") is a mushroom rock in the Zittau Mountains near Oybin in the German state of Saxony.

Geology 
The Kelchstein consists of a Cretaceous sandstone with very little cementing material. Its unusual mushroom shape has been caused by wind and other erosive processes on sandstone strata of different hardness.

Climbing 
The Kelchstein is one of the best known climbing rocks in the Zittau Mountains. It was first climbed before 1785, when woodcutters fixed a plaque to the summit; the plaque is no longer there. Its development for sports climbing started on 3 September 1911. Dresden climbers ascended the rocks with the aid of a tree at its northwestern corner. The first sports climb without any aids was up the present-day "Old Way" (Alter Weg) by Siegfried Schreiber on 26 June 1946. The Kelch is one of the most difficult summits to climb in the Zittau Mountains. Today there are only five routes, all at climbing grades of VIIc and VIIIc.

External links 

Biwak: Bergsport, Wandern, Abenteuer about 
climbers on the Kelchstein in the ARD Mediathek

Climbing areas of Germany
Rock formations of Saxony
Natural monuments in Saxony
Zittau Mountains
Görlitz (district)